Fernando Garibay is an American record producer, songwriter, DJ, academic and entrepreneur.

Artistic career 
He was the official musical director of Lady Gaga's Born This Way Ball and the producer of her Born This Way album.  Fernando Garibay has produced and written for world class artists including Lady Gaga, U2, Sia, Whitney Houston, Britney Spears, Shakira, Bruno Mars, Kylie Minogue, Enrique Iglesias, The Pussycat Dolls, Snoop Dogg, Paris Hilton, Ellie Goulding, JJ Lin, Giorgio Moroder, Shaggy, Sting, Wiz Khalifa, Lizzo et al.

He has been nominated for numerous Grammy Awards and has helped write and produce a number of records, including five US number ones and several top 10 dance records on Billboard. 

Furthermore, Fernando was recognized as the producer on the Grammy Award-winning recording The Fame Monster by Lady Gaga, when it won the "Best Pop Vocal Album" award at the 53rd Annual Grammy Awards in 2010.

Fernando Garibay, formally an executive, producer and artist at Interscope Records; spent over a decade as part of the in house creative team at Interscope, under the mentorship and direction of Jimmy Iovine. He is the founder and CEO of The Garibay Institute & Center  and Paradise/Interscope. Fernando is a lecturer at Harvard University (Harvard Business School) and at the Massachusetts Institute of Technology (MIT) in Cambridge, Massachusetts. Fernando has also participated with the World Economic Forum'/Young Global Leaders/Shapers as a keynote speaker and salon contributor.

Production discography

1998
 Ana García "For You"
 Ana García "Disco Floor"
 Ana García "Just Can't Help"
 Ana García "Groove On"
 Ana García "Keep On Movin'"
 Ana García "Shake Your Body"
 Ana García "Party People"
 DJ Fernando Oz "Out Of Love"
 Transister "Dizzy Moon"
 Space Monkeys "Acid House Killed Rock And Roll"

1999
 Enrique Iglesias "Bailamos"
 Enrique Iglesias "Rhythm Divine"

2000
 Enrique Iglesias "Be With You"
 Ricky Martin "Shake your Bon-Bon"

2001
 Enrique Iglesias "Don't Turn Off the Lights"
 Enrique Iglesias "Escape"
 Valeria "Ooh La La" Valeria

2002
 Enrique Iglesias "Mentiroso"
 Enrique Iglesias "Love To See You Cry"
 Patricia Manterola "Que Ritmo No Pare"
 Patricia Manterola "The Rhythm"
 Patricia Manterola "Ojos Negros"
 Patricia Manterola "Magic Eyes"

2003
 Enrique Iglesias "Say It"
 Enrique Iglesias "Not in Love"
 Enrique Iglesias "Addicted"
 Sting "Stolen Car"

2004
 Ashlee Simpson "La La (Fernando Garibay Remix)"
 The Corrs "Summer Sunshine (Extended Mix)"

2005
Elkland "Apart"

2006
 Jzabehl "Naughty Boys" featuring Alexis y Fido
 Jzabehl "It's All About Me"
 Jzabehl "Throw Your Hands Up"
 Jzabehl "It's Not Over" featuring Mr. Phillip
 Jzabehl "O' I Know"
 Jzabehl "Open My Eyes"
 Mario Vazquez "Don't Lie"
 Paris Hilton "Stars Are Blind"

2007
 Valeria "Girl I Told Ya"
 Jordin Sparks "Save Me"
 will.i.am "One More Chance"
 will.i.am featuring Snoop Dogg "The Donque Song"

2008
 Britney Spears "Quicksand"
 Britney Spears "Amnesia"
 New Kids on the Block "Don't Cry"
 Nikki Flores "Could You Ever"
 Lady Gaga "Text You Pictures" (Unreleased song, intended for The Pussycat Dolls)

2009
 The D.E.Y "Taken"
 The Pussycat Dolls "Bottle Pop"
 Enrique Iglesias "Away"
 Lady Gaga "Dance in the Dark"
 The Paradiso Girls "Who's My B...."
 The Paradiso Girls "My Dj"
 The Paradiso Girls "Down"
 The Paradiso Girls "Unpredictable"
 The Paradiso Girls "Prima Donna"
 The Paradiso Girls "Just Friends"
 Sean Kingston "My Girlfriend"
 Whitney Houston "Nothin' But Love"
 Sugababes "Wait For You"
 Sugababes "Wear My Kiss"
 Cassie "Sell It" featuring Diddy
 Enrique Iglesias "Tu Y Yo"

2010
 Starshell "SuperLuva"
 Natalia Kills "Love Is A Suicide"
 Natalia Kills "Broke"
 Natalia Kills "Cold"
 Far East Movement "Fighting For Air"
 Lady Gaga "Alejandro" (American Idol Version)

2011
Born This Way — Lady Gaga
"Americano"
"Bad Kids"
"Bloody Mary"
"Born This Way"
"Born This Way (The Country Road Version)"
"The Edge of Glory"
"Fashion of His Love"
"Fashion of His Love (Fernando Garibay Remix)"
"Government Hooker"
"Heavy Metal Lover"
"Highway Unicorn (Road To Love)"
"Marry the Night"
"The Queen"

2012
Pink Friday: Roman Reloaded  —  Nicki Minaj
"Come on a Cone"
"I Am Your Leader"
200 km/h in the Wrong Lane  —  t.A.T.u.
"All The Things She Said (Fernando Garibay Remix)"

2013
 Sean Paul "Legacy"
 Colette Carr "Never Gonna Happen"
 Prince Royce "Kiss Kiss"

2014
Shakira.  —  Shakira
"Chasing Shadows"
Kylie and Garibay - Sleepwalker EP
"Glow"
"Wait"
"Break This Heartbreak"
"Chasing Ghosts"
 Lea Michelle "On My Way"

2015
Kylie and Garibay - Kylie and Garibay EP
"Black and White" (featuring Shaggy)
"If I Can't Have You" (featuring Sam Sparro)
"Your Body" (featuring Giorgio Moroder)

2016
 Alan Cumming "Someone Like The Edge Of Firework"

2017
Armin van Buuren and Garibay — Single 
"I Need You (featuring Olaf Blackwood)"

2018
Big Freedia "Karaoke" (featuring Lizzo)
Justin Jesso "My Body"
"Last Summer" (with Andrew Rayel featuring Jake Torrey)
Benjamin Ingrosso 
"No Sleep" 
"Love Songs" 
Poppy
"Immature Couture"
"Hard Feelings"
"Iconic"
 Poppy + Garibay
 "Aristocrat"
 "Blush" (unreleased)
 Far East Movement
 "Save The Night ft. Shaggy"
 "Let The Future In"
 Crush
 "Lay Your Head On Me"
 Sia "Blinded By Love"
 Sia "Hologram"

2019 

 Tiffany Young 
"Born Again"
"Magnetic Moon"
"Run For Your Life"
Heart Full Of Rage - Tyla Yaweh
"High Right Now"
"Who Shot Johnny?"
"Wraith Skating featuring PNB Rock"
"Chiquita"
 Armin van Buuren and Garibay "Phone Down"
 Justin Jesso and Seeb "Bigger Than"
 Steve Aoki ft. Sting and Shaed "2 In A Million"

2021 
 JJ Lin 
"Not Tonight"
"While I Can"
"Like You Do"
"All In Your Mind"

References

External links

Official website
Interview, HitQuarters Aug 2012

Living people
Record producers from Los Angeles
Musicians from Los Angeles
American people of Mexican descent
American people of Filipino descent
1982 births